The Daecheong Dam is a combination concrete gravity (made of concrete) and embankment dam (made of earth) on the Geum River,  north of Daejeon in South Korea. The multi-purpose dam provides benefits of flood control, water supply and hydroelectric power generation. Construction on the dam began in 1975 and was formally commissioned on 1 December 1980.

The reservoir is operated by the Korea Water Resources Corporation (K-water) for flood control, hydro-power generation and water supply.

Geography
The dam is built on the Geum River, also spelled Keum River or Geumgang River, which is the longest river in the central part of South Korea. The land use pattern of the watershed is 74.5% of forest and hilly area, 16.3% of agricultural land of paddy and other crops, and 9.2% of urban area. The river is joined by five major tributaries and exhibits a dendritic (in the form of branches of a tree) drainage pattern. The hydrology of the project is thus influenced by the seasonal monsoon climate. There is scenic road on the entire periphery of the lake where Hyeonamsa Temple, and Munuihyanggyo Confucian School are located.

Features
It has three saddle dams on the reservoir periphery to prevent spilling of water. Following the building of the dam flood damage in the downstream reaches has been substantially prevented and salinity of the downstream land has also reduced. The annual inflow into the reservoir is 2,451 million cubic meter. The effective storage (live storage) created by the dam is 790 million cubic meter. The High Flood Level (HFL) of the reservoir is EL 80 m and the Full Reservoir Level (FRL) is EL 76.5 m.

The water supply from the reservoir is provided to Chungcheong, Daejeon, Cheongju, Jeollabuk-do areas which include Gunsan, Jeonju, and Iksan. The dam has hydro power facility with installed capacity of 90 MW and the annual power generation is around 240 million kWh.
 
Nutrient loading (contribution to Eutrophication) of the reservoir has occurred due to agricultural flows and from livestock farms in the catchment. It is classified as meso-stratified (influenced by biotic and abiotic factors).

Organic matter loading (contributed by plants and animals causing changes in the chemical oxygen demand ( COD, a measure of the amount of organic compounds in water), Mn (manganese)) in the lake is about 78.3% during heavy rainfall season, from June to September.

Daecheong Dam Water Culture Center

On the bank of the reservoir, a water-themed cultural museum called the Daecheong Dam Water Culture Center was established on 6 July 2004. It has three exhibition halls which display information on the dam, uses of water, environmental features of the area around on the Geumgang River also on the aspect of cultural aspects of the villages which were submerged by the reservoir and about people living on  its periphery. The center also has a theater, information center, and an observatory.

See also

List of power stations in South Korea

References

Bibliography

Dams in South Korea
Hydroelectric power stations in South Korea
Buildings and structures in Daejeon
Dams completed in 1980
Flood control in South Korea